Zeisel is a surname. Notable people with the surname include:

Eva Zeisel (1906–2011), Hungarian-born American industrial designer
Hans Zeisel (1905–1992), American sociologist and legal scholar
Steven Zeisel, medical academic
Yeruham Zeisel (1909–1987), Israeli politician